Plain Township is one of the sixteen townships of Wayne County, Ohio, United States.  The 2000 census found 2,894 people in the township.

Geography
Located in the western part of the county, it borders the following townships:
Chester Township - north
Wayne Township - northeast corner
Wooster Township - east
Franklin Township - southeast corner
Clinton Township - south
Lake Township, Ashland County - southwest corner
Mohican Township, Ashland County - west
Perry Township, Ashland County - northwest corner

No municipalities are located in Plain Township, although the unincorporated community of Funk lies in the southwestern part of the township.

Name and history
Statewide, other Plain Townships are located in Franklin, Stark, and Wood counties.

Government
The township is governed by a three-member board of trustees, who are elected in November of odd-numbered years to a four-year term beginning on the following January 1. Two are elected in the year after the presidential election and one is elected in the year before it. There is also an elected township fiscal officer, who serves a four-year term beginning on April 1 of the year after the election, which is held in November of the year before the presidential election. Vacancies in the fiscal officership or on the board of trustees are filled by the remaining trustees.

References

External links
Wayne County township map
County website

Townships in Wayne County, Ohio
Townships in Ohio